Anne Woods (5 December 1947 - 29 March 2015) of Egremont, Cumbria was a British gurner, winning the women's world championship 28 times. Her world record was ratified by the Guinness Book of Records in November 2010.

References

1947 births
2015 deaths
Contortionists